Brent Leslie Anderson (born 10 March 1960) is a former New Zealand rugby union player. A lock, Anderson represented Wairarapa Bush and Waikato at a provincial level, and was a member of the New Zealand national side, the All Blacks, in 1986 and 1987. He played three matches for the All Blacks: namely a test match against Australia; and two matches against Japan that were not accorded full international status. He also won several Man of the Match awards while playing Irish club rugby, most notably in a sterling display against Thomond RFC, heavily trouncing club stalwart Mal Sherlock, in the Charity Cup.

References

1960 births
Living people
Rugby union players from Lower Hutt
People educated at Bishop Viard College
New Zealand rugby union players
New Zealand international rugby union players
Waikato rugby union players
Rugby union locks
Wairarapa Bush rugby union players